Irina Pando (born 24 July 1995) is a Swiss footballer who plays as a defender for Bayer Leverkusen and the Switzerland national team.

International career
Pando made her debut for the Switzerland national team on 14 January 2020, as a starter against Malta.

References

1995 births
Living people
Women's association football defenders
Swiss women's footballers
Switzerland women's international footballers
Footballers from Zürich
FC Luzern Frauen players
Swiss Women's Super League players
FC Zürich Frauen players
Frauen-Bundesliga players
Bayer 04 Leverkusen (women) players
Swiss expatriate women's footballers
Expatriate women's footballers in Germany
Swiss expatriate sportspeople in Germany